The Rugini were a tribe in Pomerania. They were only mentioned once, in a list of yet to be converted tribes drawn up by the English monk Bede (also Beda venerabilis) in his Historia ecclesiastica of the early 8th century:
<blockquote>Sunt autem Fresones, Rugini, Danai, Hunni, Antiqui Saxones, Boructuari; sunt alii perplures hisdem in partibus populi paganis adhuc ritibus servientis.</blockquote>
Whether the Rugini were remnants of the Rugii is speculative. The term Rugini'' was also interpreted as the first mention of the Slavic Rani (also Rujani), who in the Middle Ages dwelled on the isle of Rügen.

See also 
Early history of Pomerania

References 

Early Germanic peoples
History of Pomerania
West Slavic tribes